Kallen is both a surname and a given name. Notable people with the name include:

Horace Kallen (1882–1974), American philosopher
Jackie Kallen (born 1946), American boxing manager
Kitty Kallen (1921–2016), American singer
Arvid Emanuel Kallen (1895-1969), Swedish American businessman
Kallen Esperian (born 1961), American singer

Fictional characters:
Kallen Stadtfeld, character in the anime series Code Geass

See also
Callen (disambiguation)
Gunnar Källén (1926–1968), Swedish Theoretical physicist and a professor at Lund University
Kalen
Kellan
Kylen
Van der Kellen
Wilberd van der Kallen (born 1947), Dutch mathematician

English-language masculine given names